There are more than a dozen beaches of Aruba.   Aruba is part of the Kingdom of the Netherlands and an island country in the mid-south of the Caribbean Sea.

Beaches
The beaches of Aruba include the following:
 Andicuri Beach, 
 Arashi Beach, 
 Baby Beach, 
 Bachelor's Beach, 
 Battata Beach, 
 Beach at the Blue Residences, 
 Boca Catalina Beach, 
 Boca Grandi Beach, 
 Boca Prins Beach, Arikok National Park, 
 Daimari Beach, 
 Divi Beach, 
 Dos Playa Beach, Arikok National Park, 
 Druif Beach, 
 Eagle Beach, 
 Flamingo Beach, Renaissance Island, 
 Grapefield Beach, 
 Hadicurari Beach, 
 Iguana Beach, 
 Malmok Beach, 
 Manchebo Beach, 
 Mangel Halto Beach, 
 Palm Beach, 
 De Palm Island, 
 Rincon Beach, 
 Rodgers Beach, 
 Surfside Beach, 
 Wariruri Beach,

Gallery

See also

 Geography of Aruba
 Islands of Aruba
 Caves of Aruba

References

Beaches of Aruba
Aruba
Beaches of the Caribbean by country
Geography of Aruba